Bumthang River (also known as Murchangphy Chhu)  is a river in Bhutan. It joins the Tongsa Chhu or Mangde Chhu in southern Bhutan and the combined stream flows into the Manas River.

See also 
Bumthang District

References 

Rivers of Bhutan